The World University Archery Championships, an international competition in archery,  have been held in alternate years from 1996 to 2016, each time in a different host city. There are events using the recurve and compound bows.

Edition

Champions

Recurve

Compound

References

Archery
Youth